Scott Tallon Walker is an architecture practice with its head office in Dublin, Ireland and further offices in London, Galway and Cork. It is one of the largest architecture practices in Ireland. Established in 1931 as Scott and Good, becoming Michael Scott Architect in 1938, and Michael Scott and Partners in 1957 before changing to the current Scott Tallon Walker in 1975. Scott Tallon Walker and its earlier incarnations developed a reputation for modernism.

History

The firm was started by Michael Scott, one of Ireland's foremost architects of the 20th Century, with Norman D. Good and was called Scott and Good. The firm initially developed a reputation for designing hospitals.

In 1938 Michael Scott broke his partnership with Norman D. Good to form 'Michael Scott Architect' During the Second World War the firm survived on small commissions, and following the war went on to work for the Córas Iompair Éireann (CIÉ), the national transport company, and designed such buildings as Donnybrook Bus Garage (together with Ove Arup, who set up Arup's first overseas office in Dublin at the request of Michael Scott), and Dublin Central Bus Station (Busaras).

In 1957 the firm was recast as 'Michael Scott and Partners', with Ronnie Tallon and Robin Walker becoming partners in the practice. The design work from this period becoming more modern, influenced by Robin Walker's previous experience of working with Le Corbusier in Paris and studying under Mies van der Rohe in Chicago, and resulted in buildings such as the RTÉ Radio Building, the Bank of Ireland Headquarters in Baggot Street (1968–1978) and the former P.J. Carroll's Factory (1967–69) in Dundalk, County Louth, which has also recently been added to Ireland's list of protected structures. In 1975 the firm was renamed 'Scott Tallon Walker' following the retirement of the company's founder, Michael Scott, and the firm was awarded the prestigious RIBA Gold Medal. Robin Walker retired from the company in 1982.

In December 2010, Dr Ronnie Tallon KHS was awarded the James Gandon Medal, a new lifetime achievement award from the Royal Institute of the Architects of Ireland. In the citation he was called "one of the most influential Irish architects of the last century".

Notable buildings

The company has been responsible for many influential and recognisable buildings in Ireland, such as the Dublin central bus station, known as Busáras, completed in 1953, which was one of the first buildings of the modern style in Ireland. The firm attempted to bring art and architecture together, commissioning art to be incorporated in their buildings (such as at Busáras). The artists Patrick Scott and art critic Dorothy Walker both worked for the firm, and played a significant part in its architecture. The firm also worked with Louis le Brocquy and commissioned work from him and his wife Anne Madden.

The Aviva Stadium in Dublin, Ireland, on the site of the old Lansdowne Road site, was designed by Populous in collaboration with Scott Tallon Walker Architects. The sustainably-built stadium features a host of green building features that enable it to integrate into its site while making the most of available resources. Designed as a sweeping crystalline bowl, the stadium harvests rainwater to irrigate the field, reuses waste heat for hot water, and is topped with a transparent roof that allows daylight to suffuse the interior spaces.

Buildings with awards
Keeper House and Lodge, 2015: Irish Architecture Awards (Best House – Winner), 2016; World Architecture Festival, (House Category - Finalist) 
Aviva Stadium, 2010: Plan Expo (AAI) (OPUS Award – Winner)
The Gibson Hotel, Point Village, 2010: The Association of Landscape Contractors of Ireland (ALCI) (Overall Award for Landscaping in Ireland)
St. Patrick's Place Development, Cork, 2010: Royal Institute of the Architects of Ireland (RIAI Best Sustainable Building)
McCann FitzGerald Headquarters, 2010: Architectural Association of Ireland (AAI) (Architectural Association of Ireland Excellence in Architectural Design)
Commissioners of Irish Lights Headquarters, 2008: Royal Institute of the Architects of Ireland (RIAI Best Public Building)
Tulach a' tSolais Memorial, 1998 – 2000: Royal Institute of the Architects of Ireland (RIAI Gold Medal) Highly Commended
East Point Business Park, 1999: Regional Award Royal Institute of the Architects of Ireland
Dublin Civic Offices, 1996: Regional Award Royal Institute of the Architects of Ireland
University College Dublin – Biotechnology Building, 1994: Irish Architecture Award Architectural Association of Ireland (Dublin – Over £200,000)
Busaras, 1953–55: Royal Institute of the Architects of Ireland (RIAI Gold Medal) Winner
Radio Telefís Éireann Studios, 1959–61: Royal Institute of the Architects of Ireland (RIAI Gold Medal) Winner
G.E.C. Factory, 1962–64: Royal Institute of the Architects of Ireland (RIAI Gold Medal) Winner
House at Summercove, 1965–67: Royal Institute of the Architects of Ireland (RIAI Medal for Housing) Winner
Restaurant Building, UCD, 1968–70: Royal Institute of the Architects of Ireland (RIAI Gold Medal) Winner
Ronald Tallon House, 1971–73: Royal Institute of the Architects of Ireland (RIAI Medal for Housing) Winner
John and Aileen O`Reilly Library, Dublin City University, 2002: SCONUL Library Design Award.

Other notable projects
Carroll's Cigarette Factory, Dundalk (Now part of Dundalk Institute of Technology)
Gate Theatre, Dublin
1 St Mary's Lane, Ballsbridge, Dublin, Ireland
 Papal Cross, Phoenix Park, Dublin

Other projects

Lapps Quay Hotel and Office Development, Cork Lapps Quay Hotel and Office Development
Entrance Pavilion, Dublin Zoo Entrance Pavilion, Dublin Zoo
Royal Marsden Hospital Radiopharmaceutical Production Unit Royal Marsden Hospital RPU
Royal Preston Hospital Radiopharmaceutical Production Unit Royal Preston Hospital RPU
University College Cork – Tyndall National Institute UCC – Tyndall National Institute
GIP Cyroi R&D and Incubator Building, Reunion Island GIP Cyroi R&D and Incubator Building
International Financial Services Centre, Dublin – A&L Goodbody IFSC A&L Goodbody
Citibank Headquarters, Dublin Citibank
Fingal County Council Civic Offices, Dublin Fingal County Council Civic Offices
National Stadium of Ireland & Abbotstown Masterplanning
Church of Christ the King, Brentwood, London
Donnybrook Bus Garage (damaged by road widening)
Ritz Cinema in Athlone adjoining the road bridge
Bank of Ireland Headquarters, Baggot Street, Dublin
 Factory Co. Louth
 Ulster Bank, Suffolk Street. (destroyed.)
 Bank at St. Stephen's Green opposite College of Surgeons.
 Office Building, corner of St. Stephen's Green and Harcourt Street.
 O'Reilly Institute, Trinity College, Westland Row.
 Science Buildings, Trinity College, Lincoln Place.
 O'Reilly Hall, University College Dublin, Belfield.
 Engineering Building, University College Dublin, Belfield.
 Canteen Building, University College Dublin, Belfield.
 Four Provinces Ballroom, Harcourt Street, Dublin. ( Demolished.)
 Central Remedial Clinic, Clontarf.
 Lisney office Building, St. Stephen's Green, Dublin.
 Houses at Silchester Road, Glenageary, Co. Dublin.
 Goulding Summer House, Enniskerry, Co. Wicklow. (1973)

References and sources
Notes

Sources
 Dorothy Walker (1997) Modern art in Ireland. Dublin: Liliput, .
 John O'Regan (2006) Scott Tallon Walker Architects: 100 Buildings and Projects 1960–2005. Dublin: Gandon Editions, .
 Michael Scott: Architect – in (Casual) Conversation with Dorothy Walker. Dublin: Gandon Editions (December 1996),

External links
Official website
Modernism at UCD
Archiseek – Irish Architecture

Irish architects
1931 establishments in Ireland
Organizations established in 1931